Aquiles Serdán is one of the 67 municipalities of Chihuahua, in northern Mexico. The municipal seat lies at Santa Eulalia. The municipality covers an area of 651.1 km².

As of 2010, the municipality had a total population of 10,688, up from 3,742 as of 2005.

The municipality had 82 localities, the largest of which (with 2010 populations in parentheses) were: Santa Eulalia (7,135), classified as urban, and Ninguno (CERESO) (2,010), classified as rural.

References

Municipalities of Chihuahua (state)